Christopher William Graham Guest, Baron Guest PC (7 November 1901 – 25 September 1984) was a British judge.

Biography 
Born in Edinburgh, Guest was educated at Merchiston Castle School, Clare College, Cambridge (MA), and Edinburgh University (LLB). He was admitted to the Faculty of Advocates in 1925 and to the English Bar (Inner Temple) in 1929. During World War II, he served in the Army, first in the Royal Artillery and then as a deputy judge-advocate in the War Office, ending the war as a Major. He was appointed King's Counsel in 1945  and was appointed Sheriff of Ayr and Bute, transferring in 1954 to be Sheriff of Perth and Angus. He served as Dean of the Faculty of Advocates from 1955 to 1957.

In 1957, Guest was appointed a Senator of the College of Justice, taking the judicial courtesy title of Lord Guest. On 20 January 1961, he was appointed Lord of Appeal in Ordinary and was created a life peer with the title Baron Guest, of Graden in the County of Berwick. In the same year, Guest was invested to the Privy Council and in 1971, he retired as Lord of Appeal.

References

1901 births
1984 deaths
People educated at Merchiston Castle School
Law lords 
Members of the Privy Council of the United Kingdom
Members of the Judicial Committee of the Privy Council
Guest
Deans of the Faculty of Advocates
Scottish sheriffs
British Army personnel of World War II
Royal Artillery officers
War Office personnel in World War II
Military personnel from Edinburgh